Garnet Norman "Norm" Wipf (born April 12, 1939) was a Canadian politician. He served in the Legislative Assembly of Saskatchewan from 1977 to 1978, as a Progressive Conservative member for the constituency of Prince Albert-Duck Lake. He is an insurance salesman.

References

1939 births
Living people
Politicians from Prince Albert, Saskatchewan
Progressive Conservative Party of Saskatchewan MLAs